The Rev. Edward Hartopp Craddock,  D.D. (29 November 1810 – 27 January 1886) was an Oxford college head in the 19th century.

Craddock was born in Shenstone, Staffordshire and educated at Balliol College, Oxford, matriculating 1827, and graduating B.A. in 1831. At Brasenose College he graduated M.A. in 1834 as Edward Grove, his birth name, and B.D. & D.D. in 1854. He held the living at Tedstone Delamere; and was Principal of Brasenose from 1853 until his death. He was married to novelist Harriet Cradock.

Notes

 

19th-century English Anglican priests
Alumni of Balliol College, Oxford
Principals of Brasenose College, Oxford
People from Shenstone, Staffordshire
1810 births
1886 deaths